Milestone is a former provincial electoral district  for the Legislative Assembly of the province of Saskatchewan, Canada, south of Regina. Originally named "South Regina", this constituency was one of 25 created for the 1st Saskatchewan general election in 1905; although a riding of that name had been contested in the North-West Territories since 1888. It was dissolved and merged with the Bengough district (as Bengough-Milestone) and parts of Thunder Creek and Qu'Appelle before the 18th Saskatchewan general election in 1975.

It is now part of the constituency of Indian Head-Milestone.

Members of the Legislative Assembly

Election results

|-

 
|Provincial Rights
|James Benjamin Hawkes
|align="right"|800
|align="right"|47.85%
|align="right"|–
|- bgcolor="white"
!align="left" colspan=3|Total
!align="right"|1,672
!align="right"|100.00%
!align="right"|

|-
 
|style="width: 130px"|Provincial Rights
|Albert Eugene Whitmore
|align="right"|1,097
|align="right"|51.55%
|align="right"|+3.70

|- bgcolor="white"
!align="left" colspan=3|Total
!align="right"|2,128
!align="right"|100.00%
!align="right"|

|-

 
|Conservative
|Thomas John How
|align="right"|861
|align="right"|45.05%
|align="right"|-3.40
|- bgcolor="white"
!align="left" colspan=3|Total
!align="right"|1,911
!align="right"|100.00%
!align="right"|

|-

|Independent
|James Balfour
|align="right"|1,566
|align="right"|46.82%
|align="right"|–
|- bgcolor="white"
!align="left" colspan=3|Total
!align="right"|3,345
!align="right"|100.00%
!align="right"|

|-

|- bgcolor="white"
!align="left" colspan=3|Total
!align="right"|Acclamation
!align="right"|

|-

|- bgcolor="white"
!align="left" colspan=3|Total
!align="right"|3,236
!align="right"|100.00%
!align="right"|

|-

 
|Conservative
|Arthur Edward Westbrook
|align="right"|840
|align="right"|25.61%
|align="right"|-
|- bgcolor="white"
!align="left" colspan=3|Total
!align="right"|3,280
!align="right"|100.00%
!align="right"|

|-

|style="width: 130px"|Independent
|Joseph Patterson
|align="right"|2,913
|align="right"|59.80%
|align="right"|-

|- bgcolor="white"
!align="left" colspan=3|Total
!align="right"|4,871
!align="right"|100.00%
!align="right"|

|-

 
|Conservative
|Joseph Patterson
|align="right"|1,365
|align="right"|30.58%
|align="right"|-29.22

|Farmer-Labour
|E. Blaine Moats
|align="right"|1,108
|align="right"|24.82%
|align="right"|–
|- bgcolor="white"
!align="left" colspan=3|Total
!align="right"|4,464
!align="right"|100.00%
!align="right"|

|-

|Independent
|Sam Horner
|align="right"|2,451
|align="right"|41.53%
|align="right"|-

|- bgcolor="white"
!align="left" colspan=3|Total
!align="right"|5,901
!align="right"|100.00%
!align="right"|

|-
 
|style="width: 130px"|CCF
|Frank Malcolm
|align="right"|3,302
|align="right"|59.94%
|align="right"|-

|- bgcolor="white"
!align="left" colspan=3|Total
!align="right"|5,509
!align="right"|100.00%
!align="right"|

|-
 
|style="width: 130px"|CCF
|Jacob Erb
|align="right"|2,803
|align="right"|45.31%
|align="right"|-14.63

|Lionel Aston
|align="right"|2,363
|align="right"|38.20%
|align="right"|–

|- bgcolor="white"
!align="left" colspan=3|Total
!align="right"|6,186
!align="right"|100.00%
!align="right"|

|-
 
|style="width: 130px"|CCF
|Jacob Erb
|align="right"|3,558
|align="right"|51.63%
|align="right"|+6.32

|- bgcolor="white"
!align="left" colspan=3|Total
!align="right"|6,891
!align="right"|100.00%
!align="right"|

|-
 
|style="width: 130px"|CCF
|Jacob Erb
|align="right"|2,839
|align="right"|44.00%
|align="right"|-7.63

|- bgcolor="white"
!align="left" colspan=3|Total
!align="right"|6,452
!align="right"|100.00%
!align="right"|

|-
 
|style="width: 130px"|CCF
|Jacob Erb
|align="right"|2,397
|align="right"|40.72%
|align="right"|-3.28

 
|Prog. Conservative
|John R. McMorris
|align="right"|403
|align="right"|6.85%
|align="right"|-
|- bgcolor="white"
!align="left" colspan=3|Total
!align="right"|5,887
!align="right"|100.00%
!align="right"|

|-

 
|CCF
|James M. Hubbs
|align="right"|1,972
|align="right"|35.45%
|align="right"|-5.27
 
|Prog. Conservative
|Leonard F. Westrum
|align="right"|1,023
|align="right"|18.39%
|align="right"|+11.54
|- bgcolor="white"
!align="left" colspan=3|Total
!align="right"|5,563
!align="right"|100.00%
!align="right"|

|-

 
|NDP
|Fred F. Petruic
|align="right"|1,920
|align="right"|38.24%
|align="right"|+2.79
 
|Prog. Conservative
|J.K. Glenn
|align="right"|610
|align="right"|12.15%
|align="right"|-6.24
|- bgcolor="white"
!align="left" colspan=3|Total
!align="right"|5,021
!align="right"|100.00%
!align="right"|

|-

 
|NDP
|Edna Bradley
|align="right"|2,393
|align="right"|47.25%
|align="right"|+9.01
|- bgcolor="white"
!align="left" colspan=3|Total
!align="right"|5,064
!align="right"|100.00%
!align="right"|

See also 
South Regina – Northwest Territories territorial electoral district (1870–1905).

Electoral district (Canada)
List of Saskatchewan provincial electoral districts
List of Saskatchewan general elections
List of political parties in Saskatchewan
Milestone, Saskatchewan

References 
 Saskatchewan Archives Board – Saskatchewan Election Results By Electoral Division

Former provincial electoral districts of Saskatchewan